Anthopotamus distinctus is a species of hacklegilled burrower mayfly in the family Potamanthidae. It is found in southeastern Canada and the eastern United States.

References

Further reading

 

mayflies
Insects described in 1935